Serindian art is the art that developed from the 2nd through the 11th century C.E. in Serindia or Xinjiang, the western region of China that was within the cultural sphere of Central Asia during the time.

It derives from the Greco-Buddhist art of the Gandhara district of what is now Afghanistan and Pakistan. Gandharan sculpture combined Indian traditions with Greek influences. 

Modern researchers hypothesize that Buddhist missionaries travelling on the Silk Road introduced this artistic influence, along with Buddhism itself, into Serindia, resulting in a style that is a hybrid of Greek, Chinese and Persian.

In modernity, Serindian art was rediscovered through the expeditions of Sir Aurel Stein in Central Asia at the beginning of the 20th century.

Gallery

See also
Buddhist art
Silk Road transmission of Buddhism

References
 Hopkirk, Peter (1980). Foreign Devils on the Silk Road: The Search for the Lost Cities and Treasures of Chinese Central Asia. Amherst: The University of Massachusetts Press. .

External links
Francine Sliwka, Two aspects of Serindian art: Serindia, where etymology and geography meet

Ancient Central Asian art